The sport of football in Mayotte is run by the Ligue de Football de Mayotte. The association administers the national football team, as well as the Mayotte Division Honneur.